Czerwień was a West Slavic settlement located near the site of modern Czermno near Tyszowce. In early Middle Ages, the town was the administrative centre of the so-called Czerwień Towns, that is the region roughly correspondent to later Red Ruthenia. The town itself had been destroyed by a Tartar raid around 1289, never to be rebuilt. Its role as the local administrative centre was taken over by the town of Bełz.

Czerwien Land
In addition to being the name of an ancient city, long since destroyed, Land of Czerwien was the name of a region in the southeast of Poland. See Red Ruthenia.

Most of the Land of Czerwien was seized by the  Soviet Union, first in September 1939 during the Soviet invasion of Poland.

Then at the end of World War II Czerwien is one of the territories annexed by the Soviet Union. The main cities in Czerwien, taken into the USSR and now in Ukraine are Lwow, Kolomea, Kowel, Lutsk, Rovno, Sokal, Stryy, Ternopol, etc. Only a very small part of the original Czerwien territory remains in present-day Poland.

During World War II, one of the new Polish squadrons in the Royal Air Force was named  No. 309 Land of Czerwien Squadron.

Razed cities
Populated places disestablished in the 13th century
1289 disestablishments in Europe
13th-century disestablishments in Poland